The Department of the Special Minister of State was an Australian government department that existed between March 1983 and July 1987. It was the second so-named Australian Government department.

History
The Department was one of three new Departments established by the Hawke Government in March 1983, to ensure the priorities of the Labor Government could be given effect to readily following the federal election of that month.

The Department was dissolved in July 1987 as part of a large overhaul of the Public Service that reduced the number of departments from 28 to 17. Its functions were dispersed between several departments, and the department's Secretary, Darcy McGaurr, was appointed an Associate Secretary in the Department of Primary Industries and Energy.

Scope
Information about the department's functions and/or government funding allocation could be found in the Administrative Arrangements Orders, the annual Portfolio Budget Statements and in the Department's annual reports.

The functions of the Department at its creation were:
Provision of facilities for members of the Parliament other than in Parliament House
Information Co-ordination
Police Affairs
Co-ordination of protective services

Structure
The Department was a Commonwealth Public Service department, staffed by officials who were responsible to the Special Minister of State.

References

Special Minister of State
Ministries established in 1983
1983 establishments in Australia
1987 disestablishments in Australia